WJDJ (1490 AM) was a radio station broadcasting a country music format. Formerly licensed to Hartsville, South Carolina, United States, the station was owned by Beaver Communications. Before being assigned to Hartsville, the WJDJ call letters were on a Top 40/CHR station in Somerset, Kentucky.

History
The station went on the air as WSDC in 1972, changing to WTNI on January 25, 1989.  On July 10, 2002, the station changed its call sign to WJDJ.

The station's license was returned to the Federal Communications Commission (FCC) by the licensee on August 1, 2013, and the FCC cancelled the license on August 8, 2013.

References

External links

JDJ
Defunct radio stations in the United States
Radio stations disestablished in 2013
Radio stations established in 1989
1989 establishments in South Carolina
2013 disestablishments in South Carolina
JDJ
Hartsville, South Carolina